The SS Metallurg Anosov (Russian: Металлург Аносов) was a merchant ship of Black Sea Shipping Company (Soviet Union). the ship was one of the project 567K Leninsky Komsomol class, a multi-purpose tweendecker freighter with steam turbine engines. The ship takes its name from scientist and metallurgist Pavel Anosov.

Specifications

Modifications
The SS Metallurg Anosov was one of the four Leninsky Komsomol-class cargo ships specially equipped for troop and weapon transportation. These modifications allowed the class to be used as a missile carrier.

Engines
The main engines were made at the Kirov Plant (Leningrad, USSR), and were installed in the Kherson shipyard.

Self-defence
In the event of mobilisation, the ship could mount several anti-aircraft guns on the rotary turrets where the cargo cranes were mounted.

Record of service
After the completion of construction in Kherson shipyard, the ship passed sea trials for three days in September 1962. The ship was commissioned by Black Sea Shipping Company on 29 September 1962. At the time, the turbine-runner Metallurg Anosov was the fastest merchant vessel in the Soviet Union. The ship's dimensions: length overall 179 m, width – 22.6 m, moulded depth – 16 m, speed – .

After the signing of the act of acceptance, the ship was moved to Odessa. Hold number 4 was converted for troop transportation by the dock workers, allowing for up to 1,600 soldiers to be bunked aboard. The vessel also took on fuel, food, fresh water, and other marine supplies before moving to Nikolayev for the loading of its main cargo, a set of missiles.

Maiden voyage
The maiden voyage of Metallurg Anosov occurred during the Cuban blockade, the most stressful period of the Cuban Missile Crisis.

The ship was initially loaded in Nikolayev port with missiles of an unknown type and also a special containers for rocket fuel were latched onto the main deck.

A large number of troops from the 51st Missile Division, 664th Missile Regiment, including the regiment headquarters, combat support, and service subdivisions were housed in hold number 4 on 3 October 1962. At the time, only the commanding officer knew that the destination was Cuba. Before deploying, General Degtyarev, who was in charge of the Defence Ministry at the time, held a briefing. The general then handed a secret package, marked "To be opened four days after the passage of the Strait of Gibraltar" to the master of the ship Babienko. Later that day, at 02:00 on the 4th of October 1962, the ship unmoored and began its maiden voyage to the Strait of Gibraltar.

Turkish warships met the ship close to the Bosphorus. After quarantine formalities, the warships accompanied the SS Metallurg Anosov through the Bosphorus, the Marmara Sea and Dardanelles to access the Aegean Sea.

During transit through the Bosphorus, a barge without any illumination or signal lights appeared beside the Metallurg Anosov at night. Russian officials theorized that the Turks would have used a collision as pretext to storm the vessel, exposing the secret shipment.

A man aboard a similar ship taking the same route, the Divnogorsk, recounted the voyage:

Combined with the difficulties of transporting a large number of people on a vessel not designed for such, several difficulties were encountered with the ship's cargo. Primarily, the refueling tracks, tanks, and containers produced toxic fumes, and the containers themselves were volatile at high temperatures. The fuel could become toxic to people in the surrounding area, and there was a risk of explosion during the hot weather. Over these fuel tanks and containers, seawater was poured almost 24 hours per day to avoid an explosion from overheating. Living conditions of the people who accompanied the cargo were difficult. They breathed toxic substances, were irradiated, and accordingly became sick.

The rocket fuel "heptyl" was carried in special containers which were not present in the holds of the most common commercial vessels.

Four days after passing through the Gibraltar Strait the captain opened the secret package in the presence of the pompolit and the commander, Colonel Sergei Verenik. The package contained only a single line: "Turbine-runner 'Metallurg Anosov' has to sail to the Cuban port Cabañas." After it was read, the orders were burned.

Soldiers and officers came out at night only to breathe the ocean air, and to be away from the fumes below. Lessons on Cuban culture were taught during the voyage.

As the ship approached Cuba, it had several encounters with NATO forces. U.S. submarines were spotted floating in front of the ship, in an attempt to provoke a collision, or to send the ship off course. Additionally, several U.S. Navy airplanes repeatedly flew close over the ship, sometimes coming close to crashing into the ship's superstructure.

On 22 October, Metallurg Anosov arrived at the port of Cabañas. The first rank captain and two colonels met the ship at the pier. There the ship received a new order: to proceed to Mariel Bay and receive a new order from the Soviet ambassador to Cuba, Alexander Alexeyev. One general and several colonels of General Staff met the ship at the specified bay.

On 25 October, the Soviet government issued a statement of protest following the United States' blockade of Cuba as an illegal action under maritime law. Captains of Soviet vessels received an order to not obey commands from US ships forbidding them from entering Cuban waters.

On 29 October 1962 the USSR decided to take the missiles and other offensive weapons out of Cuba. Nine vessels, including the Metallurg Anosov, were allocated to the task.

The ship was quickly unloaded, and as soon as the last cargo was ashore, the captain of the ship Babienko, received an order for the ship to return to Soviet Union. However, right before ship's departure a general came aboard for inspection. He immediately halted ship's departure. It would later be revealed that the First Vice Chairman of the Council of Ministers of the USSR Mikoyan had flown to Cuba on 2 November 1962, prompting the move.

Removing missiles from Cuba
The Metallurg Anosov was one of the nine Soviet freighters involved in returning Soviet missiles and their launchers to the USSR from Cuba. The loading of the missiles and their launchers was carried out in Mariel Bay, from 2 November through 7 November 1962. During the loading, NATO aircraft flew over the port and took photos. The Metallurg Anosov sailed from Mariel on 7 November 1962.

USS Barry was ordered to investigate a Soviet merchant ship, and proceeded to her station on 9 November, sighting the merchant ship that evening. The Barry closed to within  of the Metallurg Anosovs starboard quarter, illuminated the ship's quarter and bow, and identified her. Trailing astern, the Barry followed the merchant ship, heading east away from the blockade zone, until morning. After dawn, the destroyer closed on the merchant, in order to "obtain photographs of deck cargo", until late morning when she changed course for the aircraft carrier USS Essex for refueling and to transfer the photographs.

USS Barry and a Patrol Squadron of VP-44 escorted this ship on the 10 of November, 1962. The VP-44 patrol squadron achieved international recognition of sorts when an aircraft photographed the deck while flying close surveillance over the Metallurg Anasov. The Metallurg Anasov was the only Russian vessel refusing to uncover all of the missiles lashed to the deck. The squadron verified that eight large oblong objects, which appeared to be missiles, were located on its deck and the ship was allowed to proceed. The Utica Observer-Dispatch newspaper reported on 11 November 1962:

The Metallurg Anosov arrived at its destination port in the Black Sea after 20 November and was likely unloaded before 1 December 1962.

From December 1963 to August 1964
After December 1962, the Metallurg Anosov performed voyages to Cuba and Angola under the command of Captain Babienko.

First circumnavigation

The first circumnavigation of the world for the Metallurg Anosov occurred from 4 August to 16 December 1963.

Ports of call, main straits and canals during the circumnavigation:
 Tuapse – sailed from port on 4 of August, 1963
 Bosphorus Strait transit
 Suez Canal transit
 Singapore – bunkering
 Kokura, Japan
 Nagoya, Japan
 Kobe, Japan
 Nakhodka, USSR
 Panama Canal transit
 Santiago de Cuba – discharge military cargo and likely loaded with sugar
 Montreal, Quebec, Canada – sugar discharge
 Baie-Comeau, Quebec, Canada – loading with grain
 Gibraltar – bunkering
 Bosphorus Strait transit
 Odessa – arrived 16 of December, 1963

Australian voyage
Ships of Black Sea Shipping Company rarely made call in Australian. This time the Metallurg Anosov made port in Australia, hence on this voyage the crew called it the "Australian voyage". The captain during this voyage was Nikolay Babienko.

The Metallurg Anosov sailed from the Black Sea through the Bosphorus, Dardanelles, Suez Canal entered the Red Sea and then to the final destination in the Far East.

Call to Nakhodka
The ship arrived at Nakhodka port in Russia early in 1964 to take in bunker and supply.

Call in Japan
In March 1964 the ship sailed from Japan, crossed the equator at longitude 154° 00' E on 14 March 1964, before proceeding to their destination port of Sydney, Australia.

Call in Sydney
The Metallurg Anosov proceeded to the berth for mooring in Sydney on 4 April 1964. The cargo for loading was grain. The ship briefly appears in 12th episode of NFSA "Life in Australia" series, "Life in Sydney".

Voyage from August 1964 to January 1965
The ship sailed from the Black Sea to Japan through the Suez Canal in August 1964. From Japan, the Metallurg Anosov passed to Cuba through the Panama Canal. From Cuba, the ship went back to Japan through the Panama Camal to unload a cargo of sugar in Japan. Then the vessel ran to Singapore to load rubber. After Singapore, the ship returned to the Black Sea and discharged cargo in Illichivsk port in January 1965.

Service from 1965 to 1967
For its next voyages, of Metallurg Anosov went between the Black Sea and Cuba.

The ship also visited Alexandria and Algeria between 1965 and 1967.

During its voyages to Algeria, the ship carried military cargo.

Around Africa from 1967 to 1969
During the Six-Day War in June 1967 Israel occupied the Sinai Peninsula, and as such the Suez Canal was closed for shipping between 1967 and 1975.

Therefore, the Metallurg Anosov was forced to go around Cape Horn from 1967 to 1975, visiting South African ports for bunkering for voyages from the Black Sea to Asian ports in the Indian and Pacific Oceans. During its trip, the ship crossed the equator at longitude 009° 30' W on 24 of July 1967 and the crew received Equator Line Crossing Certificates.

Circumnavigation including equatorial crossing (1969-1970)
According to another certificate of equatorial crossing, the Metallurg Anosov again circumnavigated the globe when she sailed from Odessa to Cuba. After leaving port in Cuba in late 1969 or early January 1970, the ship passed through the Panama Canal and steamed to Japan. The equator was crossed in the Atlantic Ocean in March 1970. The ship then passed around Africa and received bunker and other ship's supply in a South African port.

Around Africa from 1971–1975
The ship was in a Black Sea Soviet port in February 1971, for a change of crew.

The Metallurg Anosov skirted the epicenter of a cyclone with a strength of 8 points on the Beaufort scale, when she came back from Cuba in 1971.

The ship visited Qatar once, sometime between 15 April 1971 and February 1973.

The ship visited Ceylon in the second part of January 1973.

The ship was in Cuba at the end of March and in May 1973. After Cuba the ship was loaded in the United States and proceeded to Beirut for discharge. After Beirut the ship went back to the USSR.

During the next voyage from the USSR, the ship arrived at Cuba in the second part of September, and sailed from Havana on 7 October 1973 to Canada. During voyage, ship was repeatedly buzzed by American planes. The ship was loaded with grain in Canada, before sailing to Odessa in the second part of November 1973, and finally on to Novorossiysk port.

The ship was docked in Cuba at the end of March and in April 1975.

The ship docked in Haiphong port, Vietnam, in the second half of June, and in the first half of August 1975.

In October 1975 the ship visited Japan.

From 1976 to 1986

Metallurg Anosov visited Angola once, in 1976. The ship brought in military cargo to Luanda.

The ship was under repair in Ilyichevsk Shipyard in the summer of 1976.

Metallurg Anosov arrived in Odessa from Rijeka on 19 of February, 1977.

The ship was on Cuba in the first part of May 1979, again to deliver missiles and other military cargo.

Final journey and scrapping
Metallurg Anosov was sold for scrap on 21 March 1986 and renamed Anosov. The ship's home port and flag were changed to George Town, Cayman Islands. The ship arrived in China in May 1986. Anosov proceeded to Qinhuangdao and scrapped on 22 May 1986.

Stamps
The SS Metallurg Anosov was featured on a postage stamp issued in 2008, and another issued in 2013.

This was the only Soviet ship mentioned in Cuban Missile Crisis and Cold War stamps, as it was involved in both the Cuban Missile Crisis and other Cold War operations.

See also

 Operation Anadyr
 Cuban blockade
 Cuban Missile Crisis
 Leninsky Komsomol class cargo ships

References

1962 ships
Cuba–Soviet Union relations
Cuban Missile Crisis
Leninsky Komsomol-class cargo ships
Soviet Union–United States relations
Ships built at Kherson Shipyard
Ships built in the Soviet Union